Franklin South was a parliamentary electorate in the southern part of the Auckland Region of New Zealand from 1881 to 1890. During the three parliamentary terms of its existence, the electorate was represented by Ebenezer Hamlin.

Population centres
The previous electoral redistribution was undertaken in 1875 for the 1875–1876 election. In the six years since, New Zealand's European population had increased by 65%. In the 1881 electoral redistribution, the House of Representatives increased the number of European representatives to 91 (up from 84 since the 1875–76 election). The number of Māori electorates was held at four. The House further decided that electorates should not have more than one representative, which led to 22 new electorates being formed, including Franklin South, which necessitated a major disruption to existing boundaries. Basically, the former  electorate was split up into Franklin North and Franklin South.

Franklin South originally included the towns of Pukekohe and Waiuku. It covered the area from the West Coast to the Firth of Thames. In 1887 with the growth of Auckland, Papakura was transferred from Franklin North.

In the 1890 electoral redistribution, the House of Representatives reduced its membership from 91 to 70, which caused significant changes to electorate boundaries. Franklin South was abolished and most of its area went to the reconstituted Franklin electorate, but Papakura went to the northern neighbour again. The new  electorate covered Franklin North and include Papakura.

History
The electorate was represented by one Member of Parliament, Ebenezer Hamlin.

Election results
Key

Notes

References

Historical electorates of New Zealand
1881 establishments in New Zealand
1890 disestablishments in New Zealand
New Zealand electorates in the Auckland Region